Singles Live Unreleased is a compilation album by Royal Trux.  It was released in 1997 by Drag City as a triple LP box set and a double CD.

Track listing
All songs written by Neil Hagerty and Jennifer Herrema, except where noted

Side one
"Esso Dame" – 1:51
"Mercury" – 3:50
"No Fixed Address" – 3:29
"Red Tiger" – 5:12
"Lucy Peaupaux" – 3:44

Side two
"June Night Afternoon" – 3:54
"Steal Your Face" – 3:10
"Back to School" – 4:12
"Faca Amolada" (Ronaldo Bastos, Milton Nascimento) – 4:39
"Luminous Dolphin" – 3:16
"Spike Cyclone" – 3:59

Side three
"Vile Child" – 3:44
"Law Man" (Grace Slick) – 2:53
"Shockwave Rider" (Mike Fellows, Hagerty, Herrema) – 3:59
"Chairman Blow" – 7:02
"Womban" (Larry Kessler) – 3:49

Side four
"Cut You Loose" – 2:58
"Baghdad Buzz" – 4:08
"Hero/Zero" – 2:28
"Statik Jakl" – 4:03
"Gett Off" – 2:41
"Teeth" – 4:21

Side five
"Cleveland" – 4:00
"Theme from M*A*S*H" (Johnny Mandel, Mike Altman) – 2:11
"Strawberry Soda" – 1:50
"Sunflavor" – 3:08
"Love Is..." – 3:00

Side six
"Ratcreeps" – 4:47
"Hair Beach" – 3:42
"Sometimes" – 1:33
"Signed, Confused" (Hagerty, Herrema, Rian Murphy) – 5:56
"Aviator Blues" – 4:11

References 

Royal Trux albums
1997 compilation albums
B-side compilation albums
Drag City (record label) albums
Domino Recording Company compilation albums